Wanda Jean Allen (August 17, 1959 – January 11, 2001) was sentenced to death in 1989 for the murder of Gloria Jean Leathers, 29, her longtime girlfriend. Allen was the first black woman to be executed in the United States since 1954. She was the sixth woman to be executed since executions resumed in the United States of America in 1977. Her final appeals and the last three months of her life were chronicled by filmmaker Liz Garbus in the documentary The Execution of Wanda Jean (2002).

Background
Wanda Jean Allen was born on August 17, 1959, the second of eight children. Her mother was an alcoholic; her father left home after Wanda's last sibling was born and the family lived in public housing and scraped by on public assistance.

At the age of 12, Allen was hit by a truck and knocked unconscious, and at 14 or 15 she was stabbed in the left temple. It was found that Allen's actual abilities were markedly impaired and that her IQ was 69. Found particularly significant was that the left hemisphere of her brain was dysfunctional, impairing her comprehension, her ability to logically express herself, and her ability to analyze cause and effect relationships. It was also concluded that Allen was more chronically vulnerable than others to becoming disorganized by everyday stresses, and thus more vulnerable to a loss of control under stress.

By age 17, she had dropped out of high school.

Death of Dedra Pettus
In 1981, Allen was sharing an apartment with Dedra Pettus, a childhood friend-turned-girlfriend. On June 29, 1981, they got into an argument, and Allen shot and killed Pettus. In her 1981 confession, Allen stated that she accidentally shot Pettus from roughly 30 feet away while returning fire from Pettus' boyfriend. However, the forensic evidence was inconsistent with Allen's story; in particular, a police expert believed that bruises and powder burns on Pettus' body indicated that Allen had pistol-whipped her, then shot her at point-blank range. Nevertheless, prosecutors cut a deal with Allen, and she received a four-year sentence in exchange for a guilty plea to a manslaughter charge. She served two years of the sentence.

Pettus was buried at Trice Hill Cemetery in Oklahoma City, Oklahoma.

Gloria Jean Leathers
Seven years after the death of Dedra Pettus, Allen was living with her girlfriend Gloria Jean Leathers. The two met in prison and had a turbulent and violent relationship. On December 2, 1988, Leathers, 29, was shot in front of The Village Police Department in Oklahoma City. Fifteen minutes before the shooting, the two women were involved in a dispute at a grocery store. A city officer escorted the two women to their house and stood by while Leathers collected her belongings. Before Leathers left the house, Allen asked her to "stay and attempt to work out their difficulties." When Allen followed Leathers to her car, Leathers grabbed a garden rake, and struck Allen in the face with the tool. Leathers and her mother left and drove to file a complaint against Allen. Allen followed them, claiming that she was trying to get Leathers not to leave her. When Allen approached Leathers in the parking lot, she saw Leathers still had the rake. Subsequently, Allen returned to her car, grabbed a gun, and then, when she saw Leathers closely approaching, fired one shot that severely wounded Leathers.  Leathers' mother witnessed the shooting. Two police officers and a dispatcher heard the shot fired, but no police department employee witnessed the shooting. The police recovered a .38-caliber handgun they believe was used in the shooting near the women's home.  Leathers died from the injury three days later, on December 5, 1988.

Leathers was buried at Green Acres Memorial Gardens Cemetery, Sperry in Tulsa County, Oklahoma.

Trial
The state charged Allen with first-degree murder and announced that it would seek the death penalty. Evidence that Leathers had a history of violent conduct, and that she had stabbed a woman to death in Tulsa, Oklahoma in 1979, was central to the self-defense argument at Allen's trial. Allen testified that she feared Leathers because she had boasted to her about the killing. The defense sought to corroborate this claim with testimony from Leathers' mother, whom Leathers had told about the stabbing. However, the prosecution objected, and the court prohibited the introduction of such testimony because it was considered hearsay. The prosecutor depicted Allen as a remorseless liar. The jury found her guilty of first-degree murder and sentenced her to death.

During the punishment phase the prosecutors argued that Allen should be sentenced to death because she had been previously convicted of a felony involving the use or threat of violence; that she was a continuing threat to society; and she committed the murder to avoid arrest or prosecution. The jury found that the first two aggravating circumstances existed in Allen's case. Her defense presented numerous mitigating circumstances including good relationship with her family, good work habits, and her fear of the victim.

In the sentencing phase the prosecution presented testimony on the circumstances of the death of Dedra Pettus, and compared this previous crime to the death of Leathers.

In a 1991 affidavit, her defense lawyer David Presson stated that after the trial he learned that when Allen was 15 years old, her IQ was measured at 69, placing her "just within the upper limit of the classification of mental retardation" according to the psychologist who analyzed her and that an examining doctor had recommended a neurological assessment because she manifested symptoms of brain damage. The lawyer stated, "I did not search for any medical or psychological records or seek expert assistance for use at the trial."

A psychologist conducted a comprehensive evaluation of Allen in 1995 and found clear and convincing evidence of cognitive and sensory-motor deficits and brain dysfunction possibly linked to an adolescent head injury. 

Of the five members of the Oklahoma Pardon and Parole Board, three were appointed by Governor Frank Keating.

Keating who considered giving Allen a stay based on the narrow issue of whether the Oklahoma Pardon and Parole Board had enough information regarding her education. Allen's attorneys have pointed to her score, a 69, on an IQ test she took in the 1970s, arguing she was in the range of intellectual disability. Prosecutors said Allen testified during the penalty phase of her trial that she had graduated from a high school and received a medical assistant certificate from a college. But they said Allen dropped out of high school at 16 and never finished course work in the medical assistant program.

Execution
Allen spent 12 years on death row. Her application for clemency was denied.

While in prison, she became a born-again Christian. The Reverend Robin Meyers, who served as a spiritual adviser to Allen, is quoted as saying,

Allen was executed by lethal injection by the State of Oklahoma on Thursday, January 11, 2001 at Oklahoma State Penitentiary in McAlester. Twenty-four relatives of murder victim Gloria Leathers and manslaughter victim Dedra Pettus traveled there for the execution. Many of them watched the execution from behind a tinted window. While lying on the execution gurney, Allen said, "Father, forgive them. They know not what they do." She also stuck her tongue out and smiled at her appeal lawyer, David Presson, who had become her friend. He says she was "dancing on the mattress, while they tried to kill her." She was pronounced dead at 9:21 p.m. Relatives of Leathers expressed the execution gave them "closure".

She was buried at Trice Hill Cemetery in Oklahoma City.

See also 

 Capital punishment in Oklahoma
 Capital punishment in the United States
 List of people executed in Oklahoma
 List of people executed in the United States in 2001
 List of women executed in the United States since 1976

Further reading
 Julie Salamon. The Execution of Wanda Jean (2002). The New York Times. Retrieved on 2007-11-11.
 Dimitra Kessenides. The Execution of Wanda Jean. Salon.com (2002-03-18). Retrieved on 2007-11-11.
 Adam Buckley Cohen. Who was Wanda Jean? - black woman executed in the United States. The Advocate (2001-03-13). Retrieved on 2007-11-11.
 USA: Death penalty / Legal concern - Wanda Jean Allen. Amnesty International (2000-11-17). Retrieved on 2007-11-11.
 Wanda Jean Allen put to death. USA Today (2001-01-12). Retrieved on 2007-11-11.
 Wanda Jean Allen. The Clark County Prosecuting Attorney. Retrieved on 2007-11-11.
Wanda Jean Allen v State of Oklahoma Direct Appeal Allen v. State, 871 P. 2d 79 - Okla: Court of Criminal Appeals 1994. Retrieved 2010-04-13

References

1959 births
2001 deaths
21st-century executions by Oklahoma
American people executed for murder
American female murderers
Executed African-American people
Place of birth missing
Executed American women
People convicted of murder by Oklahoma
21st-century executions of American people
People executed by Oklahoma by lethal injection
American people convicted of manslaughter
1988 murders in the United States
LGBT people from Oklahoma
LGBT African Americans
LGBT Christians
21st-century African-American women
20th-century American LGBT people